Lochmaeus manteo, the variable oakleaf caterpillar moth,  is a moth of the family Notodontidae. It is found in eastern North America.

The wingspan is 37–50 mm. Adults are on wing from April to October.

The larvae feed on various deciduous trees, especially  Quercus species. The larva can spray formic acid which is reported to cause blisters or severely irritate human skin.

External links

 Bug Guide
 Stinging Caterpillars A Guide to Recognition of Species Found on Alabama Trees
 Caterpillars of Eastern Forests
 Images

Notodontidae
Moths of North America
Moths described in 1841